Microbacterium halimionae is a bacterium from the genus Microbacterium which has been isolated from the salt-marsh plant Halimione portulacoides near the Ria de Aveiro in Murtosa, Portugal.

References

External links
Type strain of Microbacterium halimionae at BacDive -  the Bacterial Diversity Metadatabase	

Bacteria described in 2015
halimionae